"Say It Ain't So" is a song by the American rock band Weezer. It was released as the third and final single from the band's self-titled 1994 debut album.

Written by frontman Rivers Cuomo, the song came to be after he had all the music finished and one line, "Say it ain't so". Cuomo made a connection to an incident in high school where he came home and saw a bottle of beer in the fridge. He believed his mother and father's marriage ended because his father was an alcoholic, and this made him fear the marriage between his mother and step-father would end this way as well.

"Say It Ain't So" is widely considered one of the band's best songs. In 2015, Loudwire ranked the song number three on their list of the 10 greatest Weezer songs, and in 2021, Kerrang ranked the song number two on their list of the 20 greatest Weezer songs. In 2008, Rolling Stone ranked "Say It Ain't So" #72 on "The 100 Greatest Guitar Songs of All Time." Pitchfork included the song at number 10 on its "Top 200 Tracks of the 1990s".

"Say It Ain't So" is a playable track in the video games Rock Band and Rocksmith 2014 in addition to appearing on an episode of Hindsight.

Composition
"Say It Ain't So" is an alternative rock and emo song that lasts a duration of 4 minutes, 18 seconds. According to the sheet music published at Musicnotes.com by Hal Leonard Music, it is written in the time signature of common time, with a moderate rock tempo of 76 beats per minute. "Say It Ain't So" is composed in the key of C minor (Cm), while Rivers Cuomo's vocal range spans two octaves, from the low-note of B3 to the high-note of B5. The song has a basic sequence of Cm7–Gadd9–A–E in the verses and interludes, changes to C5–G5–A5–E5 at the chorus and follows B5–B5/A–E5–G5 during the bridge as its chord progression.

Song mixes

Two mixes of the song exist. The original album pressings had a mix with slightly different sounding drums, bass and no guitar feedback. However, when the band released the single, the mix that kept the guitar feedback in the song was used. The band liked this mix so much that the members asked for it to replace the version on the album, after the album had sold 3 million copies. The album now features the version with the feedback. The deluxe version features both mixes.

Track listing

Cassette single: Geffen Records / GFSC 95 (UK) 
Both sides
"Say It Ain't So" (Remix) - 4:17
"No One Else" (Live and Acoustic) - 3:15
 "Jamie (Live and Acoustic)" - 3:53

CD: Geffen Records / GFSTD 95 (UK), GED 22064 (Europe), GEFDM 22064 (Australia) 
"Say It Ain't So" (Remix) - 4:17
"No One Else" (Live and Acoustic) - 3:15
"Jamie" (Live and Acoustic) - 3:53

Limited Edition 10": Geffen Records / GFSV 95 (UK) 
Side one
"Say It Ain't So" (Remix) - 4:17
Side two
"No One Else" (Live and Acoustic) - 3:15
"Jamie" (Live and Acoustic) - 3:53

Promo CD: Geffen Records / PRO CD 4742 (US) 
"Say It Ain't So" (Remix) - 4:17

 Live acoustic tracks were recorded on April 1, 1995, at Cat's Paw Studios in Atlanta, Georgia.

Music video

The music video for "Say It Ain't So", directed by Sophie Muller, met with less success than the previous two Weezer videos directed by Spike Jonze, but the song still successfully climbed to the top 10 of the Modern Rock Tracks chart.

As noted in the Weezer DVD collection Video Capture Device and the slip cover of the re-released special edition of the group's debut album, the band filmed the music video at the house where the band used to rehearse and record. The video also features a cameo by the band's webmaster/band photographer/archivist and close friend for many years, Karl Koch.

A small poster of Mercyful Fate/King Diamond frontman King Diamond is visible several times throughout the video, most clearly during the final chorus, just as Rivers Cuomo turns his mic around.

Covers
The band Further Seems Forever covered the song on the Weezer tribute album Rock Music: A Tribute to Weezer. An episode of "One Tree Hill" featured a cover by MoZella, Wakey!Wakey!, and Juliana Hatfield. Deftones, The Sleeping, Young Guns, Finch, Real Estate and Dashboard Confessional have also covered the song live. Asher Roth sampled the song for his debut rap single "I Love College". After the song leaked onto the internet, Rivers Cuomo reportedly refused to clear sample, which prompted Roth to debut a remixed version of his song as his official debut single. Canadian Hip hop artist K-OS has also covered "Say It Ain't So" for his live EP "Much Music Presents: k-os Live", featuring vocals from Benjamin Kowalewicz of Billy Talent in 2011. Foster The People also covered the song in August 2011, after Weezer did a version of "Pumped Up Kicks". Chiptune artist Inverse Phase parodied the song on a Commodore 64, titling it "Say It Ain't Sixty-FO" Calpurnia covered the song for Spotify's Under Cover podcast in 2018

Charts

Certifications

Personnel
 Rivers Cuomo – lead vocals, lead and rhythm guitar
 Matt Sharp – bass, backing vocals
 Brian Bell – backing vocals
 Patrick Wilson – drums

References

1994 songs
1995 singles
Music videos directed by Sophie Muller
Weezer songs
Songs written by Rivers Cuomo
Songs about alcohol
Songs about marriage
Songs about divorce
Song recordings produced by Ric Ocasek
1990s ballads
Alternative rock ballads